The 2017–18 Portland Pilots men's basketball team represented the University of Portland during the 2017–18 NCAA Division I men's basketball season. The Pilots, led by second-year head coach Terry Porter, played their home games at the Chiles Center as members of the West Coast Conference. They finished the season 10–22, 4–14 in WCC play to finish in ninth place. They lost in the first round of the WCC tournament to Loyola Marymount.

Previous season 
The Pilots finished the 2016–17 season 11–22, 2–16 in WCC play to finish in last place. They defeated San Diego in the first round of the WCC tournament to advance to the quarterfinals where they lost to Saint Mary's.

Offseason

Departures

Incoming Transfers

Recruiting class of 2017

Recruiting class of 2018

Roster

Schedule and results

|-
!colspan=9 style=| Exhibition

|-
!colspan=9 style=| Non-conference regular season

|-
!colspan=9 style=|  WCC regular season

|-
!colspan=9 style=| WCC tournament

Source: Schedule

References

Portland
Portland Pilots men's basketball seasons
Portland Pilots men's basketball
Portland Pilots men's basketball
Port
Port